Tohi Te Ururangi  (died 28 April 1864) was a notable New Zealand tribal leader and assessor. Of Māori descent, he identified with the Ngāti Whakaue iwi.

References

Year of birth unknown
1864 deaths
Ngāti Whakaue people